The Société Asiatique (Asiatic Society) is a French learned society dedicated to the study of Asia. It was founded in 1822 with the mission of developing and diffusing knowledge of Asia. Its boundaries of geographic interest are broad, ranging from the Maghreb to the Far East. The society publishes the Journal asiatique. At present the society has about 700 members in France and abroad; its library contains over 90,000 volumes.

History 
The establishment of the society was confirmed by royal ordinance on April 15, 1829. Antoine-Isaac Silvestre de Sacy was the first president.

Notable people 

Jean-Pierre Abel-Rémusat
Jacques Bacot
Jean Berlie
Eugène Burnouf
Jean-François Champollion
Henri Cordier
Jean-Baptiste Benoît Eyriès
Julius Klaproth
Louis Finot
Jean Leclant
Sylvain Lévi
Abdallah Marrash
Gaston Maspero
Paul Pelliot
Joseph Toussaint Reinaud
Ernest Renan
Antoine-Jean Saint-Martin
Antoine-Isaac Silvestre de Sacy
İbrahim Şinasi
Charles Virolleaud

List of the presidents of the Société 

1822–1829: Antoine-Isaac Silvestre de Sacy
1829–1832: Jean-Pierre Abel Rémusat
1832–1834: Antoine-Isaac Silvestre de Sacy
1834–1847: Amédée Jaubert
1847–1867: Joseph Toussaint Reinaud
1867–1876: Julius von Mohl
1876–1878: Joseph Héliodore Garcin de Tassy
1878–1884: Adolphe Régnier
1884–1892: Ernest Renan
1892–1908: Barbier de Meynard
1908–1928: Émile Senart
1928–1935: Sylvain Lévi
1935–1945: Paul Pelliot
1946–1951: Jacques Bacot
1952–1964: Charles Virolleaud
1964–1969: George Coedès
1969–1974: René Labat
1974–1986: Claude Cahen
1987–1996: André Caquot
1996–2002: Daniel Gimaret
2002–present: Jean-Pierre Mahé

External links 
 L'Académie des Inscriptions et Belles-Lettres
 Journal Asiatique 
 Journal asiatique from 1822 to 1936

1822 establishments in France
Ancient Near East organizations
Learned societies of France
Asian studies